João Leonardo Risuenho do Rosário (born 29 April 1994), commonly known as João Leonardo, is a Brazilian footballer who plays as a striker for Shijiazhuang Gongfu F.C He represented Bahia in 2015 Campeonato Brasileiro Série B.

Career statistics

Club

References

External links
 
 João Leonardo at ZeroZero

Living people
1994 births
Brazilian footballers
Brazilian expatriate footballers
Association football forwards
Expatriate footballers in Portugal
Brazilian expatriate sportspeople in Portugal
Esporte Clube Bahia players
Associação Atlética Caldense players
Associação Atlética Santa Rita players
A.C. Alcanenense players
FC Dila Gori players
Paysandu Sport Club players
Treze Futebol Clube players
Campeonato Brasileiro Série B players
Campeonato Brasileiro Série D players
Erovnuli Liga players
Expatriate footballers in Georgia (country)
Brazilian expatriate sportspeople in Georgia (country)
Sportspeople from Belém